Events from the year 1838 in Scotland.

Incumbents

Law officers 
 Lord Advocate – John Murray
 Solicitor General for Scotland – Andrew Rutherfurd

Judiciary 
 Lord President of the Court of Session and Lord Justice General – Lord Granton
 Lord Justice Clerk – Lord Boyle

Events 
 Winter 1837/38 – the Neolithic settlement of Rinyo on Rousay in Orkney is discovered.
 January – leaders of the Glasgow cotton spinners' strike are sentenced to penal transportation (but cleared of murder).
 2 March – Clydesdale Bank founded in Glasgow.
 4–22 April – Leith-built paddle steamer  makes the transatlantic crossing from Cork to New York in eighteen days, though not using steam continuously.
 21 May
 Chartist meeting on Glasgow Green at which the People's Charter is launched.
 Elizabeth Jeffrey of Carluke is hanged in Glasgow for poisoning a neighbour and a lodger.
 c. June – Robert Napier receives his first contract from the Admiralty, for supply of side-lever engines for installation in HM paddle sloops Vesuvius and Stromboli.
 4 July – Edinburgh and Glasgow Railway authorised.
 25 July – Caledonian Curling Club founded in Edinburgh.
 4 August – the Court Journal prints a rumour that Archibald Montgomerie, 13th Earl of Eglinton, is going to host a great jousting tournament at his castle in Scotland. A few weeks later he confirms this.
 16 August – Debtors (Scotland) Act 1838 passed.
 7 September – Dundee paddle steamer Forfarshire (1834), homeward bound from Hull, is wrecked on the Farne Islands off the north east coast of England with the loss of more than 40 people; Grace Darling rescues nine survivors.
 The Hebridean islands of Barra and Benbecula are sold by the MacNeils and Ranald MacDonald respectively to Colonel Gordon of Cluny.
 Jenners department store established in Princes Street, Edinburgh.
 Glen Ord Distillery established on the Black Isle.
 The Ordnance Survey commences the primary triangulation of Scotland.
 David Brewster originates the stereoscope.
 Royal Scottish Academy is granted its Royal charter.
 Floors Castle is remodelled in Scottish Baronial style by William Henry Playfair for James Innes-Ker, 6th Duke of Roxburghe.

Births 
 13 January – William Miller, Free Church missionary and educationalist (died 1923)
 29 January – David Gray, poet (died 1861)
 22 February – John Joseph Jolly Kyle, chemist in Argentina (died 1922 in Buenos Aires) 
 14 March – Robert Flint, Theologian and philosopher (died 1910)
 25 March – William Wedderburn, civil servant in India (died 1918 in England)
 26 March – Alexander Crum Brown, organic chemist (died 1922)
 21 April – John Muir, conservationist (died 1914 in the United States)
 17 May – William Esson, mathematician (died 1916 in England)
 6 June – Thomas Blake Glover, merchant (died 1911 in Japan)
 6 July – Thomas John MacLagan, doctor and pharmacologist (died 1903)
 7 July – Thomas Davidson, poet (died 1870)
 22 July – John McLagan, newspaper publisher (died 1901 in Canada)
 6 August – Walter Shirlaw, artist in the United States (died 1909 in Spain)
 3 September – David Bowman, botanist (died 1868 in Colombia)
 4 September – William Gibson Sloan, Plymouth Brethren evangelist (died 1914 in the Faroe Islands)
 6 September – George Ashdown Audsley, architect, artist, illustrator, writer, decorator and pipe organ designer (died 1925 in the United States)
 9 September – Thomas Barker, mathematician (died 1907 in England)
 10 October – William M'Intosh, physician and marine zoologist (died 1931)
 16 October – John Smart, landscape painter (died 1899)
 2 November – James Dykes Campbell, merchant and writer (died 1895)
 4 November – Andrew Martin Fairbairn, theologian (died 1912 in England)
 18 November – William Keith, landscape painter in California (died 1911 in the United States)
 John Firth, Orcadian folklorist (died 1922)
 Alexander Mackenzie, historian, author, magazine editor and politician (died 1898)
 Samuel McGaw recipient of the Victoria Cross, during the First Ashanti Expedition (died in 1878)  
 Bruce James Talbert, interior designer (died 1881 in England)

Deaths 
 30 March – Thomas Balfour, politician (born 1810)
 12 July – John Jamieson, lexicographer (born 1759)
 27 July – David Hume, advocate (born 1757)
 1 October – Charles Tennant, chemist and industrialist (born 1768)
 7 November – Anne Grant, poet and author (born 1755)
 16 November – Robert Cutlar Fergusson, lawyer and politician (born 1768)

The arts
 31 August – scene painter David Roberts sets sail for Egypt to produce a series of drawings of the region for use as the basis for paintings and chromolithographs.
 November – Johann Strauss I and his orchestra visit Edinburgh and Glasgow.
 Alexander and John Bethune publish Tales and Sketches of the Scottish Peasantry.
 Angus MacKay publishes A Collection of Ancient Piobaireachd or Highland Bagpipe Music.

See also 

 1838 in the United Kingdom

References 

 
Scotland
1830s in Scotland